Tabory is a rural locality (a village) in Kalininskoye Rural Settlement, Totemsky  District, Vologda Oblast, Russia. The population was 33 as of 2002.

Geography 
Tabory is located 29 km southwest of Totma (the district's administrative centre) by road. Kashinskoye is the nearest rural locality.

References 

Rural localities in Tarnogsky District